The Designated Suppliers Program (DSP) is a procurement standard proposed by the Worker Rights Consortium and United Students Against Sweatshops. The program was designed to promote the use by US universities of suppliers that make use of a defined set of fair labor practices.

References

External links
The WRC's description of the DSP and the debate surrounding it
Statements opposing the DSP by the Fair Labor Association

Working conditions
Activism
Education issues